The following is an overview of events in 1981 in film, including the highest-grossing films, award ceremonies and festivals, a list of films released and notable deaths.

Highest-grossing films (U.S.)

The top ten films released in 1981 by box office gross in North America are as follows:

Events
 May 16 – Metro-Goldwyn-Mayer acquires beleaguered concurrent United Artists. UA was humiliated by the astronomical losses on the $40,000,000 movie Heaven's Gate, a major factor in the decision of owner Transamerica to sell it.
 March 30 - The 53rd Academy Awards are postponed due to the attempted assassination of President Ronald Reagan earlier that day. They are held the following day with a message from the President recorded for the ceremony prior to the assassination attempt.
 June 8 - Marvin Davis acquires 20th Century Fox for $720 million.
 June 12 – Raiders of the Lost Ark is released by Paramount Pictures. It became Paramount's highest-grossing film of all time and set a major standard for many action-adventure movies to date and spawned four sequels.
 August 21 – An American Werewolf in London is released and becomes a landmark in Visual Effects and Makeup.
 October 1 – MGM president and chief operating officer David Begelman becomes chairman and chief executive officer of United Artists.
 November 1 - United International Pictures is created to handle international distribution of films for United Artists, MGM, Universal Pictures and Paramount Pictures to replace Cinema International Corporation following MGM's acquisition of UA.
 November 25 - Norman Lear and his partner Jerry Perenchio agree to buy Avco Embassy for $25 million.
 November 29 – Actress Natalie Wood drowns in a boating accident off Santa Catalina Island.

Awards 

Palme d'Or (Cannes Film Festival):
Man of Iron (Człowiek z żelaza), directed by Andrzej Wajda, Poland

Golden Lion (Venice Film Festival):
Marianne and Juliane (Die Bleierne Zeit), directed by Margarethe von Trotta, W. Germany

Golden Bear (Berlin Film Festival):
Faster, Faster (Deprisa, deprisa / Vivre vite), directed by Carlos Saura, Spain / France

Notable films released in 1981
United States unless stated

A
Absence of Malice, directed by Sydney Pollack, starring Paul Newman, Sally Field, Bob Balaban, Melinda Dillon
All Night Long, starring Barbra Streisand, Gene Hackman, Diane Ladd, Dennis Quaid
...All the Marbles, starring Peter Falk, Vicki Frederick and Laurene Landon
The Amateur, starring John Savage, Christopher Plummer, Marthe Keller
American Pop, an animated rotoscope musical by Ralph Bakshi and starring Ron Thompson
A Moment of Weakness, starring Salah Zulfikar, Nelly and Hussein Fahmy (Egypt)
An American Werewolf in London, directed by John Landis, starring David Naughton, Griffin Dunne, Jenny Agutter – (US/UK)
Amy, starring Jenny Agutter and Barry Newman
Arthur, starring Dudley Moore, Liza Minnelli, John Gielgud, Geraldine Fitzgerald, Stephen Elliott, Jill Eikenberry
The Aviator's Wife (La femme de l'aviateur), directed by Éric Rohmer – (France)

B
Back Roads, directed by Martin Ritt, starring Sally Field and Tommy Lee Jones
Beau-père, directed by Bertrand Blier – (France)
Die Berührte, directed by Helma Sanders-Brahms – (West Germany)
Betrayal (Løperjenten) – (Norway)
Bianco, rosso e Verdone – (Italy)
Blind Chance (Przypadek) – (Poland)
The Blood of Hussain – (Pakistan)
Blood Wedding (Bodas de sangre), directed by Carlos Saura – (Spain)
Blow Out, directed by Brian De Palma, starring John Travolta, Nancy Allen, Dennis Franz, John Lithgow
The Boat Is Full (Das Boot ist voll) – (Switzerland)
Body and Soul, starring Jayne Kennedy, Leon Isaac Kennedy, Michael V. Gazzo
Body Heat, directed by Lawrence Kasdan, starring William Hurt, Kathleen Turner, Ted Danson, Richard Crenna, J. A. Preston, Mickey Rourke
Das Boot (Released in the U.S. in 1982), directed by Wolfgang Petersen, starring Jürgen Prochnow – (West Germany)
Buddy Buddy, directed by Billy Wilder, starring Jack Lemmon and Walter Matthau
Buriki no kunsho – (Japan)
The Burning, starring Brian Matthews – (United States/Canada)
The Bushido Blade
Bustin' Loose, starring Richard Pryor and Cicely Tyson

C
The Cannonball Run, directed by Hal Needham, starring Burt Reynolds, Dom DeLuise, Dean Martin, Sammy Davis, Jr., Roger Moore, Farrah Fawcett, Adrienne Barbeau
Carbon Copy, starring George Segal, Denzel Washington, Susan Saint James, Jack Warden
Cattle Annie and Little Britches, starring Burt Lancaster, Rod Steiger, John Savage, Diane Lane, Amanda Plummer
Caveman, directed by Carl Gottlieb, starring Ringo Starr, Dennis Quaid, Shelley Long
Chariots of Fire, directed by Hugh Hudson, starring Ben Cross, Ian Charleson, Nigel Havers, Ian Holm – (U.K.)
Charlie Chan and the Curse of the Dragon Queen, starring Peter Ustinov, Lee Grant, Angie Dickinson
Charlotte – (Netherlands)
The Chosen, starring Robby Benson, Barry Miller, Maximilian Schell, Rod Steiger
Christiane F. – We Children from Bahnhof Zoo, directed by Uli Edel, starring Natja Brunckhorst – (West Germany)
Chu Chu and the Philly Flash, directed by David Lowell Rich, starring Carol Burnett and Alan Arkin
Circle of Deceit (Die Fälschung), directed by Volker Schlöndorff, starring Bruno Ganz, Hanna Schygulla and Jerzy Skolimowski – (West Germany)
Clash of the Titans, starring Harry Hamlin, Laurence Olivier, Maggie Smith, Ursula Andress – (US/UK)
Condorman, starring Michael Crawford, Oliver Reed, Barbara Carrera – (U.K.)
Le confort et l'indifférence (Comfort and Indifference) – (Canada)
Continental Divide, starring John Belushi, Blair Brown, Allen Garfield
Coup de torchon, directed by Bertrand Tavernier, starring Philippe Noiret and Isabelle Huppert – (France)
Cutter's Way, starring Jeff Bridges, Lisa Eichhorn, John Heard

D
Dance Craze, concert documentary featuring Madness, The Beat, The Specials and others – (U.K.)
Dark Night of the Scarecrow
Dead & Buried, starring James Farentino
Deadly Blessing. starring Sharon Stone and Ernest Borgnine
Death Hunt, starring Charles Bronson, Lee Marvin, Andrew Stevens, Carl Weathers, Angie Dickinson
The Decline of Western Civilization, a documentary film
Deprisa, Deprisa (Hurry, Hurry!), directed by Carlos Saura – (Spain) – Golden Bear winner
The Devil and Max Devlin, starring Elliott Gould and Bill Cosby
Diva, directed by Jean-Jacques Beineix – (France)
Docteur Jekyll et les femmes, directed by Walerian Borowczyk and starring Udo Kier and Marina Pierro – (France) 
Do You Remember Dolly Bell? (Sjecas li se Doli Bel?) – (Yugoslavia)
Dragonslayer, starring Peter MacNicol
Dreszcze (Shivers) – (Poland)

E
Eijanaika (Why Not?), directed by Shohei Imamura – (Japan)
Ek Duuje Ke Liye (Made for Each Other) – (India)
Endless Love, directed by Franco Zeffirelli, starring Brooke Shields and Martin Hewitt
The Entity, starring Barbara Hershey, Ron Silver, Margaret Blye
Escape from New York, directed by John Carpenter, starring Kurt Russell, Lee Van Cleef, Ernest Borgnine, Donald Pleasence, Isaac Hayes, Adrienne Barbeau, Harry Dean Stanton
Escape to Victory (aka Victory), directed by John Huston, starring Michael Caine, Sylvester Stallone, Max von Sydow, Pelé
The Evil Dead, directed by Sam Raimi, starring Bruce Campbell
Excalibur, directed by John Boorman, starring Nigel Terry, Helen Mirren, Nicol Williamson, Nicholas Clay, Liam Neeson
An Eye for an Eye, starring Chuck Norris
Eye of the Needle, starring Donald Sutherland and Kate Nelligan – (U.K.)
Eyewitness, directed by Peter Yates, starring William Hurt, Sigourney Weaver, Christopher Plummer, James Woods

F
The Fan, directed by Edward Bianchi, starring Lauren Bacall, James Garner, Maureen Stapleton and Michael Biehn
Fear No Evil, directed by Frank LaLoggia, starring Elizabeth Hoffman and Stefan Arngrim
Fever (Gorączka), directed by Agnieszka Holland – (Poland)
First Monday in October, starring Walter Matthau and Jill Clayburgh
For Your Eyes Only, starring Roger Moore (as James Bond), with Carole Bouquet, Lynn-Holly Johnson – (U.K.)
Fort Apache, The Bronx, directed by Daniel Petrie, starring Paul Newman, Ed Asner, Ken Wahl
Four Friends, directed by Arthur Penn, starring Craig Wasson and Jodi Thelen
The Four Seasons, directed by and starring Alan Alda, with Carol Burnett, Rita Moreno, Sandy Dennis, Len Cariou, Jack Weston
The Fox and the Hound, with the voices of Mickey Rooney, Kurt Russell, Pearl Bailey
The French Lieutenant's Woman, directed by Karel Reisz, starring Meryl Streep and Jeremy Irons – (U.K.)
Friday the 13th Part II, directed by Steve Miner, starring Amy Steel, John Furey and Adrienne King
Full Moon High, starring Adam Arkin
The Funhouse, directed by Tobe Hooper

G
Gallipoli, directed by Peter Weir, starring Mel Gibson – (Australia)
Gangster Wars, starring Michael Nouri, Joe Penny, Brian Benben, Madeleine Stowe
Garde à Vue, starring Romy Schneider and Michel Serrault – (France)
Gas, starring Susan Anspach, Sterling Hayden, Helen Shaver – (Canada)
Ghost Story, starring Fred Astaire, Douglas Fairbanks Jr., Melvyn Douglas, John Houseman
The Girl with the Red Hair (Het meisje met het rode haar) – (Netherlands)
Going Ape!, starring Tony Danza, Stacey Nelkin, Jessica Walter, Danny DeVito
Goodbye Pork Pie – (New Zealand)
Graduation Day, starring Christopher George
The Great Muppet Caper, directed by Jim Henson – (US/UK)
Gregory's Girl, directed by Bill Forsyth – (U.K.)
Grendel Grendel Grendel, starring Peter Ustinov – (Australia)

H
Halloween II, directed by Rick Rosenthal, starring Jamie Lee Curtis and Donald Pleasence
The Hand, directed by Oliver Stone, starring Michael Caine
Hands Up!, (Ręce do góry), directed by Jerzy Skolimowski – (Poland) – originally made in 1967 but withheld
Happy Birthday to Me, starring Melissa Sue Anderson and Glenn Ford – (Canada)
Hard Country, starring Jan-Michael Vincent and Kim Basinger
Hardly Working, directed by and starring Jerry Lewis
Harry's War, starring Edward Herrmann
Heartbeeps, directed by Allan Arkush, starring Andy Kaufman and Bernadette Peters
Heavy Metal, starring John Candy – (Canada)
Hell Night, starring Linda Blair
History of the World, Part I, directed by and starring Mel Brooks, with Gregory Hines, Dom DeLuise, Madeline Kahn, Cloris Leachman, Harvey Korman
Honky Tonk Freeway, starring William Devane, Beau Bridges, Teri Garr, Beverly D'Angelo, Howard Hesseman, Jessica Tandy
The Hound of the Baskervilles (Priklyucheniya Sherloka Kholmsa i doktora Vatsona: Sobaka Baskerviley) – (U.S.S.R.)
The Howling, directed by Joe Dante, starring Dee Wallace and Patrick Macnee

I
I Love You (Eu Te Amo), starring Sônia Braga – (Brazil)
The Incredible Shrinking Woman, starring Lily Tomlin, Charles Grodin and Ned Beatty
Inseminoid, starring Judy Geeson, Stephanie Beacham, Victoria Tennant – (U.K.)
The Inventor (Der Erfinder) – (Switzerland/West Germany)

J
Just Another Missing Kid, winner of Academy Award for Best Documentary Feature – (Canada)

K
Killing Heat (Gräset Sjunger), starring Karen Black – (Sweden/Zambia)
The Killing of Angel Street – (Australia)
Knightriders, starring Ed Harris
Kranti (Revolution), starring Dilip Kumar, Manoj Kumar, Shashi Kapoor – (India)

L
Ladies and Gentlemen, The Fabulous Stains, starring Diane Lane and Laura Dern
Lady Chatterley's Lover, starring Sylvia Kristel and Nicholas Clay
The Land of Hunger (Aakali Rajyam) – (India)
The Last Chase, starring Lee Majors
Lawaaris, starring Amitabh Bachchan and Zeenat Aman – (India)
The Legend of the Lone Ranger, starring Klinton Spilsbury, winner of a Golden Raspberry Award for Worst Actor
Light Years Away (Les Années lumière), starring Trevor Howard – (France)
Lili Marleen, directed by Rainer Werner Fassbinder, starring Hanna Schygulla – (West Germany)
Lion of the Desert, starring Oliver Reed and Anthony Quinn – (Libya)
The Little Fox (Vuk) – (Hungary)
Lola, a German film directed by Rainer Werner Fassbinder, starring Barbara Sukowa and Armin Mueller-Stahl – (West Germany)
Looker, directed by Michael Crichton, starring Albert Finney, James Coburn, Susan Dey
Looks and Smiles, directed by Ken Loach – (U.K.)
The Looney Looney Looney Bugs Bunny Movie
Loophole, starring Albert Finney and Martin Sheen

M
Mad Max 2: The Road Warrior, starring Mel Gibson – (Australia)
Man of Iron (Człowiek z żelaza), directed by Andrzej Wajda – (Poland) – Palme d'Or winner
Mandala – (South Korea)
Marianne and Juliane (Die bleierne Zeit), directed by Margarethe von Trotta, starring Barbara Sukowa - Golden Lion winner – (West Germany)
Il Marchese del Grillo, directed by Mario Monicelli, starring Alberto Sordi – (Italy)
Masada, TV miniseries, starring Peter O'Toole, Peter Strauss, Barbara Carrera, David Warner
The Melody Haunts My Memory (Samo jednom se ljubi) – (Yugoslavia)
Mephisto, directed by István Szabó, starring Klaus Maria Brandauer – (Hungary/West Germany/Austria)
Il minestrone, starring Roberto Benigni – (Italy)
Modern Romance, directed by and starring Albert Brooks, with Kathryn Harrold and Bruno Kirby
A Moment of Weakness, starring Salah Zulfikar, Nelly and Hussein Fahmy – (Egypt)
Mommie Dearest, starring Faye Dunaway, Diana Scarwid, Steve Forrest – winner of five Golden Raspberry Awards including Worst Picture and Worst Actress (Dunaway)
Montenegro, starring Susan Anspach and Erland Josephson – (Sweden)
Ms. 45, directed by Abel Ferrara
Muzhiki! – (U.S.S.R.)
My Bloody Valentine – (Canada)
My Dinner with Andre, starring Wallace Shawn and Andre Gregory
The Mysterious Castle in the Carpathians (Tajemství hradu v Karpatech) – (Czechoslovakia)
The Mystery of the Third Planet (Tayna tretyey planety) – (U.S.S.R.)

N
Naseeb (Destiny), starring Amitabh Bachchan – (India)
National Heritage (Patrimonio nacional), directed by Luis García Berlanga – (Spain)
Neighbors, starring John Belushi and Dan Aykroyd
The Nesting, starring Bill Rowley, Gloria Grahame
Nice Dreams, a Cheech & Chong film
Nighthawks, starring Sylvester Stallone, Rutger Hauer, Billy Dee Williams, Lindsay Wagner, Persis Khambatta, Nigel Davenport
The Night the Lights Went Out in Georgia, starring Kristy McNichol, Dennis Quaid, Mark Hamill
Nobody's Perfekt, starring Gabe Kaplan, Alex Karras, Robert Klein

O
The Oil, the Baby and the Transylvanians (Pruncul, petrolul şi ardelenii) – (Romania)
Omen III: The Final Conflict, starring Sam Neill, Rossano Brazzi – (US/UK)
On Golden Pond, directed by Mark Rydell, starring Katharine Hepburn, Henry Fonda, Jane Fonda
On the Right Track, starring Gary Coleman
Only When I Laugh, starring Marsha Mason, Kristy McNichol, James Coco, Joan Hackett
Outland, directed by Peter Hyams, starring Sean Connery and Peter Boyle – (U.K.)

P
Passion of Love (Passione d'amore), directed by Ettore Scola – (Italy)
Paternity, directed by David Steinberg, starring Burt Reynolds and Beverly D'Angelo
La Pelle (The Skin), directed by Liliana Cavani, starring Marcello Mastroianni and Claudia Cardinale – (Italy)
Pennies from Heaven, starring Steve Martin, Bernadette Peters, Jessica Harper, Christopher Walken – based on the TV series by Dennis Potter
Pixote, directed by Héctor Babenco – (Brazil)
Polyester, directed by John Waters, starring Divine
Le Pont du Nord, directed by Jacques Rivette – (France)
Porky's, directed by Bob Clark, starring Dan Monahan, Wyatt Knight, Kim Cattrall, Boyd Gaines, Alex Karras, Susan Clark
Possession, starring Isabelle Adjani and Sam Neill – (France/West Germany)
The Postman Always Rings Twice, directed by Bob Rafelson, starring Jack Nicholson and Jessica Lange
Priest of Love, starring Ian McKellen, Janet Suzman, Ava Gardner – (UK)
Prince of the City, directed by Sidney Lumet, starring Treat Williams and Jerry Orbach
Private Lessons, starring Sylvia Kristel, Howard Hesseman, Ed Begley Jr.
The Prodigal Son (Bai ga jai), directed by and starring Sammo Hung – (Hong Kong)
The Pursuit of D. B. Cooper, starring Treat Williams, Robert Duvall, Kathryn Harrold

Q
Quartet, directed by James Ivory, starring Alan Bates, Maggie Smith, Isabelle Adjani – (U.K.)
Quest for Fire (aka La Guerre du feu), directed by Jean-Jacques Annaud – (Canada/France/United States)

R
Race for the Yankee Zephyr, starring Ken Wahl, Lesley Ann Warren, George Peppard – (New Zealand)
Raggedy Man, starring Sam Shepard and Sissy Spacek
Ragtime, directed by Miloš Forman, starring James Cagney, Howard E. Rollins Jr., Elizabeth McGovern, Mandy Patinkin, Mary Steenburgen, Brad Dourif
Raiders of the Lost Ark, directed by Steven Spielberg, starring Harrison Ford and Karen Allen
Reds, directed by and starring Warren Beatty, with Diane Keaton, Jack Nicholson, Maureen Stapleton, Gene Hackman, Paul Sorvino
Rich and Famous, directed by George Cukor, starring Jacqueline Bisset and Candice Bergen
Roar, directed by Noel Marshall, starring Tippi Hedren and Melanie Griffith
Ritam zločina – (Yugoslavia)
Roadgames, directed by Richard Franklin, starring Stacy Keach and Jamie Lee Curtis – (Australia)
Rollover, directed by Alan J. Pakula, starring Jane Fonda and Kris Kristofferson
Ruckus, starring Dirk Benedict, Linda Blair, Richard Farnsworth

S
S.O.B., directed by Blake Edwards, starring Julie Andrews, William Holden, Robert Preston, Richard Mulligan, Shelley Winters
The Salamander, starring Anthony Quinn, Franco Nero, Eli Wallach, Claudia Cardinale
Saturday the 14th, starring Paula Prentiss and Richard Benjamin
Scanners, directed by David Cronenberg – (Canada)
Secret Visit, starring Salah Zulfikar, Athar El-Hakim, Mahmoud El-Meliguy – (Egypt)
Sharky's Machine, directed by and starring Burt Reynolds, with Rachel Ward, Henry Silva, Vittorio Gassman, Charles Durning, Earl Holliman
Shaukeen, starring Ashok Kumar – (India)
Shikake-nin Baian – (Japan)
Shock Treatment, starring Jessica Harper and Cliff DeYoung
Short Working Day, directed by Krzysztof Kieślowski – (Poland)
Shaolin and Wu Tang (Shao Lin yu Wu Dang), Directed by Liu Chia-Hui, starring Adam Cheng, Gordon Liu and Wang Lung-wei – (Hong Kong)
Silence of the North, directed by Allan King, Tom Skerritt, Gordon Pinsent and Ellen Burstyn – (Canada)
The Simple-Minded Murderer (Den Enfaldige Mördaren), starring Stellan Skarsgård – (Sweden)
The Sixth (Shestoy) – (U.S.S.R.)
Smash Palace, directed by Roger Donaldson – (New Zealand)
Sogni d'oro (Golden Dreams), directed by and starring Nanni Moretti – (Italy)
Southern Comfort, directed by Walter Hill, starring Keith Carradine, Powers Boothe and Fred Ward
Sphinx, starring Lesley-Anne Down and Frank Langella
Station (Eki Station) – (Japan)
Strange Affair (Une étrange affaire), starring Michel Piccoli – (France)
Strange Behavior, starring Michael Murphy and Louise Fletcher – (New Zealand)
Stripes, directed by Ivan Reitman, starring Bill Murray, Harold Ramis, Warren Oates, John Larroquette, John Candy
Student Bodies
Suddenly at Midnight (Gipeun bam, gapjagi) – (South Korea)

T
Take This Job and Shove It, starring Robert Hays, Barbara Hershey, Art Carney
Tales of Ordinary Madness (Storie di ordinaria follia), starring Ben Gazzara and Ornella Muti – (Italy/France)
Taps, directed by Harold Becker, starring Timothy Hutton, George C. Scott, Ronny Cox, Sean Penn, Tom Cruise
Tarzan, the Ape Man, starring Bo Derek and Richard Harris
Tattoo, starring Bruce Dern and Maud Adams
Taxi zum Klo (Taxi to the Toilet) – (West Germany)
Teheran 43, starring Alain Delon – (U.S.S.R./France/Switzerland)
They All Laughed, directed by Peter Bogdanovich, starring Audrey Hepburn and Ben Gazzara
Thief aka Violent Streets, directed by Michael Mann, starring James Caan, Tuesday Weld, James Belushi, Robert Prosky
This Is Elvis, a documentary
Three Brothers (Tre fratelli), directed by Francesco Rosi – (Italy)
Threshold, directed by Richard Pearce, starring Donald Sutherland, Jeff Goldblum, Mare Winningham – (Canada)
Ticket to Heaven, starring Nick Mancuso, Saul Rubinek, Meg Foster – (Canada)
Time Bandits, directed by Terry Gilliam, starring John Cleese, Sean Connery, Shelley Duvall – (U.K.)
Tragedy of a Ridiculous Man (La tragedia di un uomo ridicolo), directed by Bernardo Bertolucci, starring Ugo Tognazzi and Anouk Aimée – (Italy)
Tree of Knowledge (Kundskabens træ) – (Denmark)
True Confessions, directed by Ulu Grosbard, starring Robert De Niro, Robert Duvall, Charles Durning, Burgess Meredith, Kenneth McMillan
The True Story of Ah Q (Ā Q zhèng zhuàn) – (China)
Tuck Everlasting

U
Under the Rainbow, starring Chevy Chase, Carrie Fisher and Billy Barty
Les Uns et les Autres, directed by Claude Lelouch – (France)
Útlaginn (Outlaw: The Saga of Gisli) – (Iceland)

V
Variola Vera – (Yugoslavia)
Vernon, Florida, a documentary

W
Whose Life Is It Anyway?, directed by John Badham, starring Richard Dreyfuss, Bob Balaban, Christine Lahti, John Cassavetes
Will, starring Robert Conrad
Winter of Our Dreams, directed by John Duigan, starring Judy Davis, Brian Brown, and Baz Luhrmann – (Australia)
Wolfen, starring Albert Finney, Diane Venora and Gregory Hines
The Woman Next Door (La Femme d'à côté), directed by François Truffaut, starring Gérard Depardieu and Fanny Ardant – (France)
Woman Who Exposes Herself (Misetagaru onna) – (Japan)

Z
Zoot Suit, starring Edward James Olmos
Zorro, The Gay Blade, starring George Hamilton, Lauren Hutton, Brenda Vaccaro, Ron Leibman

1981 Wide-release movies

January–March

April–June

July–September

October–December

Births
 January 1 - Eden Riegel, American actress
 January 6
Betty Gabriel, American actress
Rinko Kikuchi, Japanese actress and director
Jérémie Renier, Belgian actor
 January 8 – Genevieve Cortese, American actress
 January 15 - Pitbull, American rapper
 January 17 – Diogo Morgado, Portuguese actor
 January 18 - Antje Traue, German actress
 January 20 – Daniel Cudmore, Canadian actor
 January 21
Amanda Aday, American actress
Izabella Miko, Polish actress and dancer
David F. Sandberg, Swedish filmmaker
 January 22
O. T. Fagbenle, British actor, writer and director
Willa Ford, American singer, songwriter, model, television personality and actress
Beverley Mitchell, American actress
 January 23 - Julia Jones, American actress
 January 24 – Carrie Coon, American actress
 January 25 - Charlie Bewley, English actor and producer
 January 28 
 Gen Hoshino, Japanese actor and singer
 Elijah Wood, American actor
 January 29 - Tenoch Huerta, Mexican actor
 January 30 – Chieko Higuchi, Japanese voice actress
 January 31 – Justin Timberlake, American singer and actor
 February 5
 Lee Eon, South Korean actor and model (d. 2008)
 Sara Foster, American actress
 Nora Zehetner, American actress
 February 8 – Jim Parrack, American actor
 February 9 – Tom Hiddleston, English actor
 February 10
Uzo Aduba, American actress
Stephanie Beatriz, Argentine actress
 February 11 – Kelly Rowland, American singer and actress
 February 12
Jesse Hutch, Canadian actor
Lauri Lagle, Estonian actor, director and screenwriter
 February 17 – 
Joseph Gordon-Levitt, American actor
Paris Hilton, American media personality, singer and actress
 February 19 – Beth Ditto, American singer-songwriter
 February 20 - Majandra Delfino, American actress and singer
 February 22 – Elodie Yung, French actress
 February 23 
 Josh Gad, American actor and comedian 
 Mai Nakahara, Japanese voice actress
 March 2 – Bryce Dallas Howard, American actress
 March 3 – Eugene, South Korean actress and singer
 March 6 – Ellen Muth, American actress
 March 11 – David Anders, American actor
 March 17 - Nicky Jam, American singer and actor
 March 18 - Chris Geere, English actor
 March 22 - Tiffany Dupont, American actress
 March 23 - Luciana Carro, Canadian actress
 March 24 - Philip Winchester, American actor
 March 27 - Quim Gutiérrez, Spanish actor
 March 28 – Julia Stiles, American actress
 March 29
 Alexander Fehling, German actor
 Alain Moussi, Canadian/Gabonese actor and stuntman
 March 30 - Katy Mixon, American actress
 March 31 – Ryōko Shintani, Japanese voice actress
 April 8 - Taylor Kitsch, Canadian actor and model
 April 10
 Laura Bell Bundy, American actress
 Michael Pitt, American actor
 April 13 – Courtney Peldon, American actress
 April 17 - Charlie Hofheimer, American actor
 April 19
 Hayden Christensen, Canadian actor
 Catalina Sandino Moreno, Colombian actress
 April 23 – Gemma Whelan, English actress
 April 26
Luke Ford, Canadian-Australian actor
Amit Shah (actor), English actor
 April 28
Jessica Alba, American actress
Toby Leonard Moore, Australian actor
Catherine Reitman, Canadian-American actress, producer and writer
 April 29 - Alex Vincent (actor), American actor and writer
 April 30
Kunal Nayyar, British actor
Emma Pierson, English actress
Rose Rollins, American actress
 May 2 – Rina Satō, Japanese voice actress
 May 3 – Natalie Tong, Hong Kong actress and model
 May 5 
Danielle Fishel, American actress
Farid Kamil, Malaysian actor and film director
 May 11 
JP Karliak, American actor, voice actor and comedian
Austin O'Brien, American actor
 May 12 – Rami Malek, American actor
 May 13 - Ryan Piers Williams, American actor, director and writer
 May 15 – Jamie-Lynn Sigler, American actress
 May 28 – Laura Bailey, American voice actress
 May 29
Justin Chon, American actor, director and YouTube personality
Anders Holm, American actor, comedian, writer and producer
 June 1 – Amy Schumer, American actress and comedian
 June 4 – T.J. Miller, American actor, stand-up comedian, producer and writer 
 June 7 – Larisa Oleynik, American actress
 June 9 – Natalie Portman, Israeli-American actress
 June 10 – Jonathan Bennett, American actor
 June 12
Jeremy Howard (actor), American actor
Malachi Pearson, American actor
 June 13 – Chris Evans, American actor
 June 14 – Chauncey Leopardi, American actor
 June 20 – Alisan Porter, American former actress
 June 23 - Joe Taslim, Indonesian actor and martial artist
 June 26 - Jimmy Ray Bennett, American actor
 June 28 - Jon Watts, American filmmaker
 June 30 - Anna Slotky, American former actress
 July 1 - Amanda Lucas (fighter), American retired professional mixed martial artist and actress
 July 3 - Rebecca Honig, American voice actress
 July 5 - Ryan Hansen, American actor and comedian
 July 13 - Fran Kranz, American actor and director
 July 17 - Michiel Huisman, Dutch actor
 July 21
Davide Perino, Italian actor and voice actor
Romeo Santos, American singer-songwriter and actor
 July 22 - Josh Lawson, Australian actor and filmmaker
 July 24
Mohammed Amer, Palestinian-American stand-up comedian and actor
Summer Glau, American actress
 July 28 - Neil Casey, American actor, writer and comedian
 July 30
 Brandon Scott, American actor
 Lisa Wilhoit, American actress
 July 31 - Eric Lively, American former actor
 August 1 – Taylor Fry, American former child actress
 August 3 – Travis Willingham, American voice actor
 August 4
Marques Houston, American singer and actor
Meghan, Duchess of Sussex, American former actress and model
Abigail Spencer, American actress
 August 6 – Leslie Odom Jr., American actor
 August 8 – Meagan Good, American actress
 August 10 - Jon Prescott, American actor
 August 20 – Ben Barnes, English actor
 August 22
Ross Marquand, American impressionist, actor and producer
Takumi Saito, Japanese actor
 August 24 – Chad Michael Murray, American actor
 August 25 – Rachel Bilson, American actress
 August 27
Patrick J. Adams, Canadian actor
Sugar Lyn Beard, Canadian actress and radio perrsonality
 September 1 - Boyd Holbrook, American actor
 September 3 - Evgeniya Brik, Russian actress (d. 2022)
 September 4 – Beyoncé Knowles, American singer and actress
 September 8 – Jonathan Taylor Thomas, American actor
 September 9 - Julie Gonzalo, Argentine-American actress
 September 12 – Jennifer Hudson, American singer and actress
 September 14 - Miyavi, Japanese guitarist, singer-songwriter and actor
 September 15 - Ben Schwartz, American actor, voice actor, comedian, improviser, writer, director and producer
 September 16
Fan Bingbing, Chinese actress, model, producer and singer
Alexis Bledel, American actress
 September 18 - Jennifer Tisdale, American actress and singer
 September 22 - Ashley Eckstein, American actress
 September 23 – Misti Traya, American actress
 September 26 – Christina Milian, American singer and actress
 September 29 – Shay Astar, American singer and actress
 September 30 – Ashleigh Aston Moore, American-Canadian former child actress (d. 2007)
 October 1 – Rupert Friend, English actor
 October 3 – Seth Gabel, American actor
 October 9 – Zachery Ty Bryan, American actor
 October 12 – Tom Guiry, American actor
 October 18 – Graham Moore, American screenwriter
 October 22 – Michael Fishman, American actor
 October 23 - Jackie Long, American actor, writer, musician, director and producer
 October 30 - Fiona Dourif, American actress and producer
 November 1 - Matt Jones, American actor, voice artist, comedian, rapper and singer
 November 2 - Katharine Isabelle, Canadian actress
 November 6 – Lee Dong-wook, South Korean actor
 November 7 - Lotta Losten, Swedish actress
 November 9 – Scottie Thompson, American actress
 November 10 – Perla Liberatori, Italian voice actress
 November 14 - Vanessa Bayer, American actress and comedian
 November 16 – Caitlin Glass, American voice actress
 November 17 - Bojana Novakovic, Serbian-Australian actress
 November 18 – Nasim Pedrad, Iranian-American actress and comedian
 November 20 – Andrea Riseborough, English actress
 November 23 - John Lavelle (actor), American actor and playwright
 December 2 – Britney Spears, American singer and actress
 December 3
Maddy Curley, American actress
Liza Lapira, American actress
 December 5
Adan Canto, Mexican actor
Lydia Leonard, British actress
 December 8 - Dov Tiefenbach, Canadian actor and musician
 December 13 – Amy Lee, American singer-songwriter (Evanescence)
 December 15 - Brendan Fletcher, Canadian actor, screenwriter and producer
 December 16 – Krysten Ritter, American actress
 December 27
Emilie de Ravin, Australian actress
Jay Ellis, American actor
 December 28 – Sienna Miller, English actress
 December 29 - Charlotte Riley, English actress

Deaths

Film debuts 
Ben Affleck – The Dark End of the Street
Jason Alexander – The Burning
Christina Applegate – Jaws of Satan
Javier Bardem – El poderoso influjo de la luna
Kim Basinger – Hard Country
Xander Berkeley – Mommie Dearest
Kenneth Branagh – Chariots of Fire
Robert John Burke - The Chosen
Gabriel Byrne – Excalibur
James Cameron (director) – Piranha II: The Spawning
Dana Carvey – Halloween II
Jeffrey Combs - Honky Tonk Freeway
Kevin Costner – Malibu Hot Summer
Tom Cruise – Endless Love
Charles Dance – For Your Eyes Only
Jeff Daniels – Ragtime
Robert Davi – Gangster Wars
Loretta Devine – Will
Dennis Farina – Thief
Stephen Fry – Chariots of Fire
Gina Gershon – Beatlemania: The Movie
Jami Gertz – Endless Love
Bob Gunton – Rollover
Glenne Headly – Four Friends
Ciarán Hinds – Excalibur
Holly Hunter – The Burning
Jennifer Jason Leigh – Eyes of a Stranger
Peter MacNicol – Dragonslayer
Rik Mayall – Eye of the Needle
Steve Miner (director) – Friday the 13th Part 2
Alfred Molina – Raiders of the Lost Ark
Demi Moore – Choices
Bill Nighy – Eye of the Needle
Chris Noth – Waitress!
Sean Penn – Taps
Ron Perlman – Quest for Fire
Robert Picardo – The Howling
Amanda Plummer – Cattle Annie and Little Britches
Geoffrey Rush – Hoodwink
Meg Ryan – Rich and Famous
Bob Saget – Full Moon High
Vinessa Shaw – Home Sweet Home
Mindy Sterling – The Devil and Max Devlin
Fisher Stevens – The Burning
Madeleine Stowe – Gangster Wars
Henry Thomas – Raggedy Man
Kathleen Turner – Body Heat
Reginald VelJohnson – Wolfen
Diane Venora – Wolfen 
Denzel Washington – Carbon Copy
Hugo Weaving – ...Maybe This Time

See also
 List of American films of 1981
 British films of 1981
 French films of 1981
 List of German films: 1980s
List of Egyptian films of 1981
 Bollywood films of 1981
 Italian films of 1981
 Japanese films of 1981
 Swedish films of the 1980s

Notes

References

 
Film by year